The Founding of New England  is a book by James Truslow Adams. It won the 1922 Pulitzer Prize for History.

References 

Pulitzer Prize for History-winning works